John Sidney North PC (28 May 1804 – 11 October 1894), known as John Doyle until 1838, was a British soldier and Conservative Party politician. He was a Member of Parliament (MP) for 33 years.

Background
Born John Doyle, he was the son of Lieutenant-General Sir Charles William Doyle.

Political and military career
At the 1852 general election, North was returned to Parliament as one of three Members for Oxfordshire, a seat he held until the constituency was divided at the 1885 general election. In 1886, he was sworn of the Privy Council. He was also a Colonel in the British Army.

Family
North married Lady Susan, daughter of George North, 3rd Earl of Guilford, in 1835. In 1838 he assumed by Royal licence the surname of North. In 1841 the barony of North held by Lord Guildford was called out of abeyance in favour of Lady Susan, who became the tenth Baroness North. She died in March 1884, aged 87, and was succeeded by her and North's son, William. North survived his wife by ten years and died in October 1894, aged 90.

References

External links 

1802 births
1894 deaths
Conservative Party (UK) MPs for English constituencies
UK MPs 1852–1857
UK MPs 1857–1859
UK MPs 1865–1868
UK MPs 1868–1874
UK MPs 1874–1880
UK MPs 1880–1885
Members of the Privy Council of the United Kingdom